The Coordinating Minister for National Security is an appointment in the Cabinet of Singapore, initially introduced on 1 August 2003 to cover both security and defence of Singapore. However, the security and defence portfolios were dropped when the role was redesignated in 2005.

List of officeholders 
The Ministry is headed by the Prime Minister Office, who is appointed as part of the Cabinet of Singapore. The incumbent minister is Senior Minister Teo Chee Hean from the People's Action Party.

See also 
Coordinating Minister for Economic Policies
Coordinating Minister for Social Policies
Minister-in-Charge of Muslim Affairs

References

2003 establishments in Singapore
National Security